Clyde Vern Brock (born August 30, 1940) is a former professional Canadian football offensive tackle in the Canadian Football League for the Saskatchewan Roughriders. He also was a member of the Dallas Cowboys and San Francisco 49ers in the National Football League. He played college football at Utah State University. He is a member of the Canadian Football League Hall of Fame.

Early years
Brock attended Ogden High School before moving on to Utah State University, where he was a multi-sport athlete. He practiced football, basketball, baseball, wrestling and the shot put.

In football, he was a two-way tackle, playing behind Merlin Olsen and Clark Miller.

Brock missed the 1961 inaugural Gotham Bowl against Baylor University. It was claimed that he signed a contract with a professional team before the game, and the school suspended him for the contest to avoid any possible sanctions by the NCAA. Baylor won the game 24–9.

Professional career

Chicago Bears
Brock was selected by the Chicago Bears in the second round (20th overall) of the 1962 NFL Draft and by the Houston Oilers in the eighth round (63rd overall) of the 1962 AFL Draft.

Even though he was a reserve for most of his college career, he was chosen by the Bears because of his measurables and performance as a blocker. On August 30, he was waived after struggling in the Shrine game against the Green Bay Packers.

Dallas Cowboys
On September 2, 1962, the Dallas Cowboys claimed him off waivers. He was a reserve player on both offense and defense. In 1963, he focused on being a defensive tackle, before being released on October 14.

San Francisco 49ers
On October 16, 1963, he was claimed off waivers by the San Francisco 49ers. He was a backup offensive lineman that appeared in 6 games before being released on August 25, 1964.

Saskatchewan Roughriders (CFL)
It was only when Brock got to the Saskatchewan Roughriders in 1964 that he became a standout at right offensive tackle, playing his entire career with the Green Riders. He received CFL All-Star recognition in 4 consecutive years, from 1966 to 1969.

He helped the franchise win its first Grey Cup championship in 1966, a 29–14 win over the Ottawa Rough Riders. He appeared in 159 games during his CFL career and retired after the 1975 season.

He was inducted into the Canadian Football Hall of Fame as a player in 2020.

Personal life
His son Matt Brock also played in the National Football League.

References

External links
Clyde Brock CFL bio

1940 births
Living people
Sportspeople from Ogden, Utah
Players of American football from Utah
American players of Canadian football
American football offensive linemen
Canadian football offensive linemen
Utah State Aggies football players
Dallas Cowboys players
San Francisco 49ers players
Saskatchewan Roughriders players
Canadian Football Hall of Fame inductees